The Secretary General of the Lok Sabha is the administrative head of the Lok Sabha Secretariat. The secretary general is appointed by the Speaker of the Lok Sabha. The post of secretary general is of the rank of the Cabinet Secretary in the Government of India, who is the senior most civil servant to the Indian government.

Role 
In the discharge of his constitutional and statutory  responsibilities, the Speaker of the Lok Sabha is assisted by the secretary general of Lok Sabha, (whose pay scale, position and status etc. is equivalent to that of the highest-ranking official in the Government of India i.e. Cabinet Secretary), functionaries of the level of the Additional Secretary, Joint Secretary and other officers and staff of the Secretariat at various levels.

The secretary general remains in office must retire at the age of 60. The secretary general is answerable only to the Speaker; actions cannot be discussed or criticised in or outside the Lok Sabha.

On behalf of the President, the secretary-general summons each Member of Lok Sabha to attend session of the Parliament and authenticates bills in the absence of the Speaker.
The secretary general is the advisor to the speaker. The secretary general acts under the authority in the name of the speaker and passes orders in the name of the speaker. The secretary general does not work under the speaker with delegated authority.

List

See also 
 Parliament of India
 Lok Sabha
 Lok Sabha Secretariat
 Speaker of the Lok Sabha
 Deputy Speaker of the Lok Sabha
 Leader of the House in Lok Sabha
 Leader of the Opposition in Lok Sabha
 Secretary General of the Rajya Sabha

References 

Lok Sabha